Melody Lane is a 1941 American comedy film directed by Charles Lamont and written by Hugh Wedlock Jr., Howard Snyder, Morton Grant and George Rony. The film stars Leon Errol, Anne Gwynne, Robert Paige, Billy Lenhart, Kenneth Brown and Don Douglas. The film was released on December 9, 1941, by Universal Pictures.

Plot

Cast        
Leon Errol as McKenzie
Anne Gwynne as Patricia Reynolds
Robert Paige as Gabe Morgan
Billy Lenhart as Butch
Kenneth Brown as Buddy
Don Douglas as J. Roy Thomas
Baby Sandy as Sandy 
Louis DaPron as Louis
Red Stanley as Slim 
Charles Coleman as Mr. Abercrombie
Will Lee as Mr. Russo
Tim Ryan as Police Sergeant
Barbara Brown as Mrs. Stuart
 Bess Flowers as Mrs. Russo (uncredited) 
Judd McMichael as Rhythmeer Member Judd 
Ted McMichael as Rhythmeer Member Ted
Joe McMichael as Rhythmeer Member Joe
Mary Lou Cook as Rhythmeer Member Mary Lou

References

External links
 

1941 films
American comedy films
1941 comedy films
Universal Pictures films
Films directed by Charles Lamont
American black-and-white films
1940s English-language films
1940s American films